The following lists events that happened during 1948 in Southern Rhodesia.

Incumbents
 Prime Minister: Godfrey Huggins

Events
 The first general strike by African workers
 10 December 1948: Southern Rhodesia did not vote in favor of the General Assembly's Universal Declaration of Human Rights

Births
 October 8 - Josiah Tungamirai, politician, died (2005)

References

 
Years of the 20th century in Southern Rhodesia
Zimbabwe
Zimbabwe, 1948 In